The Heatherley School of Fine Art is an independent art school in London.

The school was named after Thomas Heatherley who took over as the school's principal from James Mathews Leigh (when it was named "Leigh's").  Founded in 1845, the school is affectionately known as Heatherleys. It is one of the oldest independent art schools in London and is among the few art colleges in Britain that focus on portraiture, figurative painting and sculpture.

It opened a new school, on George Street (off Baker Street), London, in November 1927 after previously being located on Newman Street. In 2008 the school moved to a purpose designed building in Lots Road, Chelsea.

Alumni

References

External links
School website

Art schools in London
Educational institutions established in 1845
Arts organizations established in 1845